Lemon Demon is a musical project and band created by American comedian and musician Neil Cicierega in 2003 in Boston, Massachusetts. Most Lemon Demon music is performed solely by Cicierega, who is the project's sole official member, but a full band is usually assembled for live performances. Cicierega previously released instrumental music and several remixes of video game music under the monikers "Trapezoid" and "Deporitaz" in the late 90's and early 2000's whilst frequently active on Adventure Game Studio.

History
Neil Cicierega released three instrumental albums under the name "Trapezoid", which was changed retroactively to Deporitaz as an existing band called Trapezoid demanded that he change it.  On the change to Lemon Demon, he said: "Eventually I started experimenting with singing, and once I felt ready to do that full time, I christened myself Lemon Demon and went into it head on."

Since 2003, Cicierega has released seven full-length albums as Lemon Demon. In 2005, he and animator Shawn Vulliez released a Flash animated music video called "The Ultimate Showdown of Ultimate Destiny" on Newgrounds. This had over 12 million views on Newgrounds as well as topping the "Funny Five" on The Dr. Demento Show for several weeks and becoming the No. 1 Request for 2006. The song was later included in the 2006 album Dinosaurchestra. In April 2009, Cicierega released his first four albums as free downloads on his website. An updated recording of "The Ultimate Showdown of Ultimate Destiny" was released to the Rock Band Network in 2010.

In January 2016, Cicierega announced Spirit Phone, a full-length Lemon Demon album released on February 29, 2016. The album was the No. 1 best-selling album on Bandcamp for the first week of its release. On July 10, 2018, it was announced that copies of the album on CD, cassette, and vinyl would be sold through Needlejuice Records, who would later distribute remastered versions of Lemon Demon's EPs I Am Become Christmas, Nature Tapes, View-Monster, Dinosaurchestra, Damn Skippy, and Hip to the Javabean. "Touch-Tone Telephone" became Lemon Demon's most played song, the first to surpass "The Ultimate Showdown of Ultimate Destiny" and, as of December 2022, garnering over 50 million plays on Spotify.

On June 19, 2020, Needlejuice Records released Needlejustice, a charity compilation album featuring 22 songs from artists they represent (including Lemon Demon) for the benefit of the NAACP Legal Defense Fund. Cicierega contributed a song to the album titled "Funkytown", which had originally been uploaded to his Patreon page in 2017. It features homages to popular songs from the 1970s and 1980s, including the titular "Funkytown" by Lipps Inc.

Viral successes

"The Ultimate Showdown of Ultimate Destiny"

On December 22, 2005, Lemon Demon and animator Shawn Vulliez released the Flash music video "The Ultimate Showdown of Ultimate Destiny" on Newgrounds. The video features cartoon versions of dozens of real-life celebrities and fictional characters, largely from 1980s and 1990s pop culture, in a large century-long brawl where "...only one will survive." It gained a cult following among web enthusiasts. and became the "user's choice" on December 28, 2005, on Newgrounds where it has been viewed over 13.1 million times. It appeared on several other websites including Albino Blacksheep.

"Brodyquest" 
On June 1, 2010, Cicierega released a video titled "Brodyquest" onto his main YouTube channel which pictured famous actor Adrien Brody going about his daily life in a comedic manner. The video became a famous meme and was released as a single and placed on the Nature Tapes EP. The video would be brought up by Stephen Colbert during his interview with Adrien Brody in a 2016 episode of The Late Show with Stephen Colbert. It has since been viewed on YouTube over 11.7 million times.

Discography

Studio albums 

Clown Circus (2003)
Live from the Haunted Candle Shop (2003)
Hip to the Javabean (2004)
Damn Skippy (2005)
Dinosaurchestra (2006)
View-Monster (2008)
Spirit Phone (2016)

Live albums 
 Live (Only Not) (2011)

Compilation albums 
 Almanac 2009 (2009)

Extended plays 
I Am Become Christmas (2012) 
Nature Tapes (2014)
One Weird Tip/Funkytown (2023)

Members

Official members
Neil Cicierega – vocals, keyboards, guitar, programming, percussion, songwriting, production

Live members
Alora Lanzillotta – bass guitar, vocals 
Charles "Chooch" Sergio – guitar 
Anthony Wry – drums , guitar, vocals 
Dave Kitsberg – guitar, vocals 
Greg Lanzillotta – drums

Timeline

References

External links 

Lemon Demon on Bandcamp
Lemon Demon on Needlejuice Records

Musical groups established in 2000
American pop rock music groups
American electronic rock musical groups
Musical groups from Massachusetts
American synth-pop groups